Dicoelosia is an extinct genus of brachiopod that lived from the Late Ordovician to the Early Devonian in Asia, Australia, Europe, North America, and South America.

Sources

 Fossils (Smithsonian Handbooks) by David Ward (Page 80)

External links
Dicoelosia in the Paleobiology Database

Prehistoric brachiopod genera
Ordovician brachiopods
Silurian brachiopods
Devonian brachiopods
Paleozoic brachiopods of Asia
Paleozoic brachiopods of Oceania
Paleozoic brachiopods of Europe
Paleozoic brachiopods of North America
Paleozoic brachiopods of South America
Late Ordovician first appearances
Early Devonian genus extinctions
Paleozoic life of British Columbia
Paleozoic life of New Brunswick
Paleozoic life of the Northwest Territories
Paleozoic life of Nunavut
Paleozoic life of Quebec
Paleozoic life of Yukon